Sir Robert Anstruther, 5th Baronet (28 August 1834 – 21 July 1886) was a Scottish Liberal Party politician who sat in the House of Commons between 1864 and 1886.

Life and career 
Anstruther was the son of Sir Ralph Anstruther, 4th Baronet and his wife Mary Jane Torrens, eldest daughter of Major-General Sir Henry Torrens, K.C.B. Anstruther was educated at Harrow School and joined the Grenadier Guards, reaching the rank of lieutenant-colonel. In 1863, on the death of his father, he succeeded to the baronetcy. He was Lord Lieutenant of Fife from 1864 to 1886 and was Deputy Lieutenant and J.P. for Caithness.

Anstruther was Member of Parliament for Fife from 1864 to 1880 and for St Andrews Burghs from 1885 to 1886.

Marriage and issue 
Anstruther married Louisa Maria Chowne Marshall, daughter of Reverend William Knox Marshall and Louisa Marsh, on 29 July 1857 at Beckenham, Kent. Their children included Sir Ralph Anstruther, who succeeded to the baronetcy, Henry Torrens Anstruther who was elected to his father's constituency and Admiral Robert Anstruther.

References

External links 
 

1834 births
1886 deaths
People educated at Harrow School
Grenadier Guards officers
Lord-Lieutenants of Fife
Members of the Parliament of the United Kingdom for Scottish constituencies
Members of the Parliament of the United Kingdom for Fife constituencies
UK MPs 1859–1865
UK MPs 1865–1868
UK MPs 1868–1874
UK MPs 1874–1880
UK MPs 1885–1886
Scottish Liberal Party MPs
19th-century Scottish politicians
Robert, 5th Baronet
Baronets in the Baronetage of Nova Scotia
Liberal Unionist Party MPs for Scottish constituencies
Liberal Party (UK) MPs for English constituencies